Mazen Gamal (born 30 January 1986 in Riyadh) is an Egyptian professional squash player. As of September 2022, he was ranked number 49 in the world.

References

1986 births
Living people
Egyptian male squash players